Dr. Palpu College of Arts and Science managed by Sree Narayana Trust, Vamanapuram, was launched as a self financing college affiliated to the University of Kerala in 2014. Named after Dr. Padmanabhan Palpu, a great social reformer inspired by the teachings of Sree Narayana Guru, the college is  avowed to providing quality education without discrimination of any sort—caste, creed or social standing. One of the aims of this institution is to bring quality higher education to the remote village of Pangode Puthussery. The institution maintains state-of-the-art infrastructure like excellent labs, a central library with a good collection of books, well-furnished class rooms, Girls hostel, sports facilities, etc. The faculty of the college is an ideal mixture of experienced professors (retired from various Arts and Science Colleges) and vibrant youth with high academic aspirations and enviable potential. The institution has already established its lead role in moulding a future India founded on equality, fairness and commitment to national integration.

References

External links

Universities and colleges in Thiruvananthapuram district
Colleges affiliated to the University of Kerala